Euan Robson (born 17 February 1954) is a retired Scottish Liberal Democrat politician. He was the Member of the Scottish Parliament (MSP) for Roxburgh and Berwickshire from 1999 to 2007. He was defeated at the 2007 election by Conservative John Lamont.

He later stood as a Lib Dem candidate in Scotland at the 2009 European Parliament elections but was unsuccessful.

References

External links 
 

1954 births
Living people
Liberal Democrat MSPs
Members of the Scottish Parliament 1999–2003
Members of the Scottish Parliament 2003–2007